"Stable Strategies for Middle Management" is a science fiction short story published in 1988 by Eileen Gunn.

Plot summary
Margaret is a corporate executive who, to prove her loyalty to the company, undergoes bioengineering that gradually transform her into a giant insect.

Reception
"Stable Strategies for Middle Management" was a finalist for the 1989 Hugo Award for Best Short Story.

Strange Horizons considered that it "must come high in any list of best SF short stories"; similarly, Michael Swanwick has placed it on his personal "short list (...) of the best short stories of the late twentieth century."

Background
The story is inspired by Gunn's experiences as an advertising director at Microsoft.

References

External links 
 

Science fiction short stories
1988 short stories
Works originally published in Asimov's Science Fiction